This is a list of aviation-related events from 1957.

Deadliest crash
The deadliest crash of this year was Maritime Central Airways Flight 315, a Douglas DC-4 which crashed in Issoudun, Quebec, Canada on 11 August, killing all 79 people on board.

Events 
 The Douglas AIR-2 Genie ("Ding-Dong") unguided air-to-air missile enters service with the United States Air Force.
 The United Kingdoms Minister of Defence, Duncan Sandys, states that the manned fighter has become obsolete and will be replaced by missiles. His 1957 Defence White Paper proposes ending the use of fighters by the Royal Air Force and concentrating on missile technology.
 American Airlines opens the American Airlines Stewardess College at Fort Worth, Texas, as the world's first centralized flight attendant training center.
 Summer 1957 – For the first time, as many passengers cross the North Atlantic Ocean by airliner as by ocean liner.

January 
 The Avro Vulcan strategic bomber enters service with the Royal Air Force. It begins to enter squadron service during the summer of 1957.
 January 3 – Trans World Airlines becomes the first airline to offer its passengers freshly brewed coffee in flight.
 January 4 – The Brooklyn Dodgers become the first professional baseball team to purchase its own airplane, buying a Convair CV-440. To reduce the CV-440s price to US$775,000, the team purchases it as part of a larger Eastern Airlines order.
 January 18 – Three United States Air Force B-52 Stratofortress bombers make the worlds first round-the-world, non-stop flight by turbojet-powered aircraft.
 January 31 – A Douglas DC-7B being operated by the Douglas Aircraft Company on a test flight with a crew of four prior to delivery to Continental Airlines collides in mid-air over Californias San Fernando Valley with a U.S. Air Force F-89J Scorpion on a test flight with a crew of two to check its radar equipment. The F-89J crashes in La Tuna Canyon in the Verdugo Mountains, killing its pilot and injuring the other crew member, who ejects to a parachute landing in Burbank, California. The DC-7B remains airborne for several minutes, dropping debris into neighborhoods below, before crashing into the grounds of a church and the athletic field of Pacoima Junior High School in the Pacoima district of Los Angeles, California, where 220 boys are gathered; the crash kills all four people on the plane and three boys on the ground, and injures an estimated 74 students. Among the dead on the DC-7B is its copilot, test pilot and actor Archie Twitchell.

February
 February 1 – Northeast Airlines Flight 823, a Douglas DC-6A, crashes in Queens, New York, shortly after takeoff from LaGuardia Airport in New York City, killing 20 of the 101 people on board and injuring 78 of the 81 survivors.
 February 5 – The official opening of Salisbury Airport – the future Harare International Airport – in Salisbury (now Harare) in the Federation of Rhodesia and Nyasaland takes place. The federation's government had commissioned the airport in July 1956.

March 
 All 11 of the Royal Navy Fleet Air Arms Royal Naval Volunteer Reserve squadrons are disbanded due to a reduction in British defence expenditures.
 March 1 – SNCASE (or Sud-Est) and SNCASO (or Sud-Ouest) merge to form Sud Aviation.
 March 4–15 – A United States Navy blimp sets a duration record for a non-rigid airship, traveling  in 264 hours 12 minutes.
 March 5 – A Blackburn Beverley C Mark I heavy transport aircraft of No. 53 Squadron, Royal Air Force, crashes in the village of Sutton Wick, then in Berkshire, England, killing 18 of the 22 people on board and two people on the ground.
 March 11 – A Flying Tiger Line Lockheed Super Constellation sets a new payload record for a commercial aircraft, carrying  on a flight between Newark, New Jersey, and Burbank, California.
 March 14 – The Vickers Viscount G-ALWE, operating as British European Airways Flight 411, crashes into a house in Wythenshawe, England, while on approach to Manchester Airport. All 20 people on board die, as do two people in the house.
 March 17 – The Philippine Air Force Douglas C-47 Skytrain Mt. Pinatubo crashes on the slopes of Mount Manunggal on Cebu in the Philippines, killing 25 of the 26 people on board. Among the dead are President of the Philippines Ramon Magsaysay, other high-ranking Philippine government officials, and former Philippine Senator Tomas Cabili; the only survivor is Philippine Herald newspaper correspondent Nestor Mata.

April 
 April 6 – Olympic Airways is created by the shipping magnate Aristotle Onassis from the ashes of bankrupt Greek state airline T.A.E.
 April 11 – North American Aviation is issued a preliminary contract to build prototypes of the XF-108 long-range interceptor aircraft for the U.S. Air Force.
 April 15 – A TAMSA Consolidated B-24J Liberator bomber (registration XA-KUN) converted for use as a civilian cargo aircraft crashes into a street in Mérida, Mexico, shortly after takeoff from Mérida-Rejón Airport, killing a child on the ground and the plane's entire crew of three. Among the dead is the Mexican actor and singer Pedro Infante, who had been co-piloting the plane.
 April 28 – The German World War II ace Heinz Bär dies in the crash of an LF-1 Zaunkönig at Braunschweig-Waggum, West Germany. He had finished World War II in May 1945 as its top jet ace with 16 kills in the Messerschmitt Me 262, the eighth-ranking German ace with 220 total victories, and second only to Hans-Joachim Marseille in the number of British and American aircraft shot down.

May 
 The national airline of Ecuador, Ecuatoriana de Aviación, is founded. It will begin flight operations in August.
 May 1 – An Eagle Aviation Vickers VC.1 Viking crashes into trees near Blackbushe Airport in Yateley, Hampshire, England, killing 34 of the 35 people on board.
 May 10 – The wreckage of Trans-Canada Air Lines Flight 810, a Canadair North Star, is found on Mount Slesse, near Chilliwack, British Columbia, Canada. The airliner had been missing since December 9, 1956. All 62 people on board had died in the crash.
 May 15 – A Royal Air Force Vickers Valiant drops the first British hydrogen bomb, over Kiritimati.

June 
 Middle East Airlines leases an Avro York cargo aircraft.
 June 1 – East Germany merges the headquarters of its air force, the Luftstreitkräfte der Nationalen Volksarmee ("Air Forces of the National People's Army") with those of its Luftverteidigung (air defense) force, forming a new headquarters called the Kommando LSK/LV ("Air Force/Air Defense Command").
 June 7 – Executing a zoom climb after a low-altitude pass during a high-speed demonstration flight at Hensley Field in Dallas, Texas, for a graduating class from the Naval Postgraduate School, a Vought F8U-1 Crusader fighter flown by a Chance Vought Aircraft pilot disintegrates, killing the pilot. The aircraft's wreckage explodes violently at low altitude over Main Street in adjacent Grand Prairie, Texas, inflicting minor injuries to several bystanders.
 June 28 – The Moroccan airline Royal Air Maroc—Compagnie Nationale de Transports Aériens renames itself Royal Air Maroc.

July 
 During an emergency evacuation rehearsal, Dwight D. Eisenhower becomes the first President of the United States to fly in a helicopter. The aircraft is piloted from the White House in Washington, D.C. to Camp David in Maryland by a U.S. Air Force officer.
 July 16
The Lockheed 1049E Super Constellation Neutron (PH-LKT), operating as KLM Flight 844, crashes into Cenderawasih Bay off the Biak Islands in Netherlands New Guinea, just after takeoff from Biak-Mokmer Airport while turning at low altitude to make a low-level pass over the airport. Fifty-eight of the 68 people on board die.
 July 19 – A U.S. Air Force Northrop F-89J Scorpion launches a live AIR-2 Genie ("Ding Dong") unguided nuclear air-to-air missile. It is the only detonation of a Genie.
 July 28 – A United States Air Force C-124 Globemaster II carrying three nuclear bombs over the Atlantic Ocean jettisons two of the bombs after experiencing a loss of power. The bombs are never recovered.
 July 31 – The Distant Early Warning (DEW) Line, a chain of radar stations designed to warn the United States and Canada of Soviet bombers approaching North America, begins operations.

August 
 An experimental Fleet Air Arm flight of Supermarine Scimitars forms at Royal Naval Air Station Ford, the first unit to be equipped with the aircraft. The Scimitar is the Royal Navys first transonic swept-wing aircraft as well as its first aircraft capable of carrying a nuclear weapon.
 The national airline of Ecuador, Ecuatoriana de Aviación, begins flight operations.
 August 1 – The North American Aerospace Defense Command (NORAD) is formed to co-ordinate U.S. and Canadian air defense.
Simons is aloft for 32 hours.
 August 21 – The U.S. Air Force formally cancels the XF-103 Mach 3 interceptor aircraft program.

September 
 September 7 – A United States Marine Corps helicopter transports a President of the United States for the first time, when the commanding officer of Marine Helicopter Squadron One (HMX-1), Virgil D. Olson, flies Dwight D. Eisenhower from Newport, Rhode Island to the White House in Washington, D.C. The flight begins the Marine Corpss association with presidential helicopter transportation, which it shares with the United States Army until 1976 before taking exclusive responsibility.
 September 12 – The United States and Canada establish the North American Air Defense Command (NORAD), integrating the headquarters of the U.S. Continental Air Defense Command and the Royal Canadian Air Force's Air Defense Command and responsible for the defense of North America against air attack. NORAD will be renamed the North American Aerospace Defense Command in March 1981.
 September 29 – Trans World Airlines inaugurates service via the polar route from Los Angeles, California, to London, England, using the Lockheed L-1649A Starliner. 
 September 30 – Austrian Airlines is formed from the merger of Air Austria and Austrian Airways

October 
 Ansett Airways (the future Ansett Australia) is renamed Ansett-ANA. 
 October 4
The Soviet Unions Sputnik 1, the worlds first artificial satellite, is launched into orbit
The Avro CF-105 Arrow rolls out from the Malton plant in Toronto, Ontario, Canada.
 October 11 – A United States Air Force B-47 Stratojet crashes during takeoff at Homestead Air Force Base, Florida, after one of its tires explodes. The bomber catches fire after the crash, destroying a nuclear bomb aboard the aircraft, but no nuclear explosion occurs.
 October 23 – The British European Airways Vickers Viscount 802 G-AOJA crashes while landing in rain and low clouds at Nutts Corner Airport in Belfast, Northern Ireland, killing all seven people on board.
 October 27 – Pioneering Italian aircraft designer Giovanni Caproni dies.

November 
 Delivery of the Handley Page Victor strategic bomber to the Royal Air Force begins.
 November 4 – A Romanian government Ilyushin Il-14P carrying some of the most prominent officials of the Romanian Workers' Party – including Grigore Preoteasa, Gheorghe Gheorghiu-Dej, Leonte Răutu, Chivu Stoica, Alexandru Moghioroș, Ștefan Voitec, and Nicolae Ceaușescu – strikes treetops in fog and crashes while on approach to Moscow's Vnukovo Airport in the Soviet Union, killing four of the 16 people on board. Preoteasa, Romania's Minister of Foreign Affairs, is among the dead, and Ceaușescu, Romania's future dictator, is injured.
 November 6 – A prototype of the Bristol Britannia crashes in Downend, England, during a test flight, killing all 15 people on board and injuring one person on the ground.
 November 7 – The Security Resources Panel of the President's Science Advisory Committee, chaired by Horace Rowan Gaither, submits "Deterrence & Survival in the Nuclear Age" – commonly referred to as the "Gaither Report" – to President Dwight D. Eisenhower. Among other things, the report finds that there is "little likelihood of SAC's [i.e., the U.S. Strategic Air Command's] bombers surviving" a Soviet intercontinental ballistic missile (ICBM) attack "since there was no way to detect an incoming attack until the first [ICBM] warhead landed," and it recommends a significant strengthening of U.S. strategic offensive and defensive military capabilities.
 November 8 – The Pan American World Airways Boeing 377 Stratocruiser 10-29 Clipper Romance of the Skies, operating as Flight 7, crashes in the Pacific Ocean during a flight from San Francisco, California, to Honolulu in the Territory of Hawaii, killing all 44 people on board.
 November 15 – After taking off from Englands Southampton Water, an Aquila Airways Short Solent flying boat develops engine trouble and crashes on the Isle of Wight while attempting to return. Forty-five of the 58 people on board die in what at the time is the second-deadliest aviation accident to have taken place in the United Kingdom and then the worst ever air disaster to occur in England.

December 
 December 21 – The first aircraft carrier designed as such to be launched in France, Clemenceau, is launched by the Brest Arsenal at Brest.

First flights 
 Stits SA-7 Skycoupe

January
 Cessna 210
 January 23 – Nord 1500-02 Griffon II

February
 February 17 – Bell X-14

March
 March 2 –Thruxton Jackaroo
 March 7 – Antonov An-10 (NATO reporting name "Cat")
 March 14 – Blume Bl.500
 March 15 – Dassault Étendard VI
 March 28 – Canadair Argus
 March 31 –Hurel-Dubois Miles HDM.105
 March 31 – Bréguet 1100

April
 April 2 – Short SC.1
 April 4 – English Electric P.1B, first fully developed prototype of the English Electric Lightning
 April 17 – Nord N 3202
 April 23 – Tupolev Tu-116

May
 May 14 – Miles M.100 Student
 May 14 – Bréguet 902 Cinzano
 May 14 – SNECMA Atar Volant
 May 16 – Saunders-Roe SR.53

July
 July 4 – Ilyushin Il-18
 July 9 – Aviation Traders Accountant
 July 16 – Aerotécnica AC-14
 July 26 – Bréguet 1001 Taon

September
 September 4 – Lockheed JetStar
 September 12 – Cessna 150
 September 23 – DINFIA IA 45

November
 November 6 – Fairey Rotodyne
 November 15 – Tupolev Tu-114 Rossiya (NATO reporting name "Cleat")
 November 20 – Hiller VZ-1 Pawnee
 November 26 – Piaggio P.166

December
 December 3 – Tipsy Nipper
 December 6 – Lockheed L-188 Electra
 December 10 – Aermacchi MB-326
 December 20 – Boeing 707
 December 23– DINFIA IA 46

Entered service 
 Hiller ROE Rotorcycle with the United States Marine Corps
 Stits SA-7 Skycoupe
 Stits SA-8 Skeeto

February
 February 1 – Bristol Britannia with BOAC

March
 March 8 – Grumman F11F Tiger, the worlds first carrier-based supersonic fighter, with United States Navy Attack Squadron 156 (VA-156)
 March 25 – Vought F8U Crusader with VF-32 Swordsmen

May
 McDonnell F-101A Voodoo with USAF

June
 June 28 – Boeing KC-135 Stratotanker with 93d Air Refueling Squadron

November
 November 19 – Fokker Friendship with Aer Lingus

Retirements 
 North American FJ-2 Fury by the United States Marine Corps
 Vought F7U Cutlass by the United States Navy

References

 
Aviation by year